The German Athletics Championships are the national championships in athletics of Germany, organised annually by the Deutscher Leichtathletik-Verband.

The competition features track and field events. Separate championships are held for non-track events, including the German Cross Country Championships, German Marathon Championships and German Race Walking Championships. The championships for combined track and field events are also held separately.

The German Athletics Championships was established in 1898 during the period of the German Empire and it was among the first major national championships, following on from the English, French, American and Canadian national events which had been established in the previous decade. Women's events were first held at the German national championships in 1920. The men's and women's championships were held at separate locations between 1925 and 1933. The competition has been held annually since its creation, with the exceptions of 1914 (year of the outbreak of World War I) and 1944–1945 (the final years of World War II).

Editions

Championship records

Men

Women

See also
 German records in athletics

References
 General source: 

 
Recurring sporting events established in 1898
National athletics competitions
Athletics competitions in Germany
Athletics